Belciug may refer to several villages in Romania:

 Belciug, a village in Drăgăneşti Commune, Prahova County
 Belciug, a village in Necșești Commune, Teleorman County
 Belciugele, a village in Romania

See also 
 Belciugatele (disambiguation)